"Prickly-Muffin" is the third episode of the first season of American animated television series BoJack Horseman. It was written by Raphael Bob-Waksberg and directed by Martin Cendreda. The episode was released in the United States, along with the rest of season one, via Netflix on August 22, 2014. In a guest role for the episode, Aisha Tyler provided her voice as Sextina Aquafina.

Plot 
BoJack reconnects with Sarah Lynn, an actress from his former sitcom Horsin' Around. The two take several drugs together, and create a chaotic scene at BoJack's house.

References

External links 
 "Prickly-Muffin" on Netflix
 

BoJack Horseman episodes
2014 American television episodes